Thomas A. "Tom" Tangretti (born September 20, 1946) is a Democratic member of the Pennsylvania House of Representatives for the 57th District and was elected in 1988. He retired prior to the 2008 election and was succeeded by Republican Tim Krieger.

Personal life
Tangretti graduated from Jeannette High School (1964), Indiana University of Pennsylvania (B.A., 1968) and the University of Pittsburgh (MPA, 1974).

He and his wife, Sandra, live in Hempfield Township, Pennsylvania.

External links
Pennsylvania House of Representatives - Tom Tangretti Official PA House website

Biography, voting record, and interest group ratings at Project Vote Smart

1946 births
Living people
Democratic Party members of the Pennsylvania House of Representatives
People from Westmoreland County, Pennsylvania
University of Pittsburgh alumni
Indiana University of Pennsylvania alumni